Weathersfield Township is one of the twenty-four townships of Trumbull County, Ohio, United States.  The 2000 census found 27,717 people in the township, 8,677 of whom lived in the unincorporated portions of the township.

Geography
Located in the southern part of the county, it borders the following townships and municipalities:
Howland Township - north
Vienna Township - northeast corner
Liberty Township - east
Youngstown - southeast corner
Austintown Township, Mahoning County - south
Jackson Township, Mahoning County - southwest corner
Lordstown - west
Warren Township - northwest

Several populated places are located in Weathersfield Township:
Much of the city of Niles, in the north
The village of McDonald, in the east
The census-designated place of Hilltop, in the east
Part of the census-designated place of Mineral Ridge, in the south

Name and history
It is the only Weathersfield Township statewide. It was named after Wethersfield, Connecticut.

Government
The township is governed by a three-member board of trustees, who are elected in November of odd-numbered years to a four-year term beginning on the following January 1. Two are elected in the year after the presidential election and one is elected in the year before it. There is also an elected township fiscal officer, who serves a four-year term beginning on April 1 of the year after the election, which is held in November of the year before the presidential election. Vacancies in the fiscal officership or on the board of trustees are filled by the remaining trustees.

References

External links
County website

Townships in Trumbull County, Ohio
Townships in Ohio